Khatun Kandi (also Romanized as Khātūn Kandī; also known as Khāt Kandi and Khatkendi) is a village in Qoltuq Rural District, in the Central District of Zanjan County, Zanjan Province, Iran. At the 2006 census, its population was 821, in 202 families.

References 

Populated places in Zanjan County